A free gingival graft is a type of gingival grafting performed to correct acquired deficiencies of the gum tissue around teeth or dental implants. Besides autologous tissues, xenogeneic collagen matrices are using for gingival augmentation after dental implantation. Simultaneous injection of stem cells may improve the grafting outcomes due to enhanced vascularization and epithelialization in affected tissues.

See also
 Gingival grafting
 Subepithelial connective tissue graft

References

Gingiva
Periodontology